The Putorana Plateau or the Putorana Mountains is a mountainous area in the Russian Federation.
It is a large massif or plateau crossed by mountain ranges. The nearest large settlement is Norilsk, where foreign travel is restricted. The city is served by Alykel Airport. 

The area of the mountains contains some of the largest known nickel deposits in the world.

Geography
The Putorana Plateau is a high-lying plateau crossed by mountain ranges at the northwestern edge of the Central Siberian Plateau. It is located east of the Yenisei River valley, between 67° and 70° N of latitude, southwest of the Anabar Plateau, north of the Syverma and Tunguska plateaus and south of the North Siberian Lowland. The main subranges of the Putorana are the Keta Range, Lontokoisky Kamen, Kharayelakh Range, Chaya-Ayan, Brus Kamen, and Lama Range, among others. Talnikovy Waterfall, is reputedly one of the highest waterfalls in Asia.

Lakes on the plateau such as the Dyupkun and Lake Lama are large and form whole ecosystems, which spread over many tens of kilometers. “Putorana” is from the native language of the Evenks and translates to “the country of lakes with steep banks”.

Russia's geographical center, Lake Vivi, is situated on the southern limit of the plateau, where it overlaps with the Syverma Plateau.

Geology
The Putorana area is mainly composed of basalt from the Siberian Traps.

Climate
The Putorana region is located above the Arctic Circle. The climate is harsh, sharply continental, with long, cold winters. However, in certain lake valleys, such as Lake Lama, there is a somewhat milder microclimate owing to the protection afforded by neighboring ranges from the northern winds. 

The snow cover in winter is relatively sparse.

Protected area
It was set up to protect the world's largest herd of wild reindeer, as well as snow sheep.

In July 2010, the Putorana Reserve was inscribed on the World Heritage List as "a complete set of subarctic and arctic ecosystems in an isolated mountain range, including pristine taiga, forest tundra, tundra and arctic desert systems, as well as untouched cold-water lake and river systems".

Natural resources 
The Plateau's minerals include igneous basalt rocks, iron ores (magnetite and hematite), silicates (prehnite, zeolite), apatites, perovskites and highly saturated copper and nickel ores. The natural resources are presented by abundant water and coal.

Gallery

See also

Great Russian Regions

References

External links 

Official website of the Putorana Nature Reserve
The Putorana Plateau Natural Heritage Protection Fund
SPRI Review 2001: Remote Sensing Group (changes in vegetation cover)
Sights of Putorana Plateau
Virtual tour to the Putorana Plateau.

Central Siberian Plateau
World Heritage Sites in Russia
Landforms of Krasnoyarsk Krai
Lava plateaus